Exomalopsis is a genus of bees in the family Apidae. They occur in the Western Hemisphere (Neotropical and Nearctic realms).

Biology
Bees of this genus build communal nests. Several examples have been documented in the literature. E. aburraensis, for example, has been known to build its nest alongside the beekeepers' honeybee hives. It excavates a tunnel over a meter deep which then branches into many underground pathways that lead to cells where larvae hatch and develop. The California species E. nitens enters cracks in dry soil and digs chambers underground. There it creates a pile of food provisions and lays eggs on top. The larvae eat the food pile and then pupate. Both E. globosa and E. similis have been noted nesting in dirt roads made of gritty red clay. The gravid female piles food in a terminal cell and then molds it into a neat loaf. She lays an egg on it and then seals the cell to allow the larva to develop within.

Several Exomalopsis are associated with kleptoparasites, especially cuckoo bees. Kleptoparasitic cuckoo bees of the genera Brachynomada, Nomada, Paranomada, and Triopasites have been found using Exomalopsis nests. The newly described cuckoo bee Nomada medellinenses moves into the nests of E. aburraensis and lays its eggs there.

Some species are hosts for parasitoid wasps of the family Mutillidae. E. solani is parasitized by the wasp Pseudomethoca bethae and E. fulvofasciata is host to at least two species of Timulla.

Taxonomy
As of 2007 there were nearly 90 described species in the genus. There are many more species known that are still undescribed.

Species include:

Exomalopsis aburraensis
Exomalopsis aequabilis 
Exomalopsis aequalis
Exomalopsis affabilis
Exomalopsis alexanderi
Exomalopsis amoena
Exomalopsis analis  
Exomalopsis apicalis   
Exomalopsis arcuata  
Exomalopsis atlantica  
Exomalopsis aureosericea  
Exomalopsis auropilosa
Exomalopsis badioventris    
Exomalopsis bahamica   
Exomalopsis bakeri
Exomalopsis bartschi 
Exomalopsis bechteli
Exomalopsis bicellularis   
Exomalopsis binotata   
Exomalopsis birkmanni
Exomalopsis boharti   
Exomalopsis bomanii   
Exomalopsis bruesi
Exomalopsis byersi    
Exomalopsis callura
Exomalopsis campestris 
Exomalopsis collaris
Exomalopsis comitanensis  
Exomalopsis compta 
Exomalopsis dasypoda
Exomalopsis digressa   
Exomalopsis dimidiata    
Exomalopsis diminuta  
Exomalopsis fernandoi
Exomalopsis fulvihirta
Exomalopsis fulvipennis 
Exomalopsis fulvofasciata 
Exomalopsis fumipennis   
Exomalopsis heteropilosa
Exomalopsis hurdi 
Exomalopsis iridipennis
Exomalopsis jenseni
Exomalopsis limata
Exomalopsis lissotera   
Exomalopsis mellipes
Exomalopsis mexicana
Exomalopsis minor
Exomalopsis morelosensis
Exomalopsis mourei
Exomalopsis neglecta
Exomalopsis nigrihirta
Exomalopsis nigrior   
Exomalopsis notabilis   
Exomalopsis otomita 
Exomalopsis paitensis
Exomalopsis paraguayensis
Exomalopsis pilosa
Exomalopsis planiceps  
Exomalopsis pubescens   
Exomalopsis pueblana   
Exomalopsis pulchella   
Exomalopsis robertsi    
Exomalopsis rufipes  
Exomalopsis rufitarsis
Exomalopsis similis   
Exomalopsis snowi
Exomalopsis solani
Exomalopsis solidaginis
Exomalopsis solitaria
Exomalopsis sororcula
Exomalopsis spangleri
Exomalopsis subtilis   
Exomalopsis tarsalis   
Exomalopsis tepaneca
Exomalopsis testacea
Exomalopsis testaceinervis    
Exomalopsis tibialis 
Exomalopsis tomentosa
Exomalopsis trifasciata
Exomalopsis vernoniae
Exomalopsis vincentana
Exomalopsis ypirangensis

References

Further reading
Timberlake, P. H. Review of North American Exomalopsis (Hymenoptera, Anthophoridae). University of California Press. 1980.

Apinae
Bee genera
Hymenoptera of North America
Hymenoptera of South America
Insects of Central America
Insects of Canada
Insects of Mexico
Insects of the United States